Ella Goldberg Wolfe (1896–2000) was a Russian Empire-born American political activist and educator, who, with husband Bertram Wolfe, co-founded the Communist Party USA.

Background

Ella Goldberg was born on May 10, 1896, in Kherson and came to Williamsburg, Brooklyn with her parents in 1906.

Career

Ella Goldberg Wolfe and Bertram Wolfe worked at the Rand School. After the passage of the Sedition Act of 1918, they were forced to go underground, living under assumed names. They lived for a time in Mexico City, where their circle of friends included Frida Kahlo and Diego Rivera. In 1929, they moved to Moscow but fell out with Stalin; they left two years later and returned to Brooklyn. Wolfe earned a degree in Spanish from Columbia University and went on to teach Spanish literature at Hunter College and in public schools in New York City.

After Stalin aligned himself with Hitler in 1939, Wolfe and her husband abandoned communism and became anti-communists. At the time, the couple found themselves hated by the left and distrusted by the political right.

In 1966, Wolfe moved to the Hoover Institution at Stanford University, where she spent her time editing her husband's papers and providing eyewitness accounts to researchers of the historic times in which she lived. Wolfe was consulted by researchers for the film "Reds".

Personal life and death

In 1910, Goldberg met Bertram Wolfe.  They married in 1917.

She became politically conservative and was a supporter of Ronald Reagan. She also became friends with Edward Teller, who was strongly anti-communist.

Ella Goldberg Wolfe died age 103 on January 8, 2000, at home in Palo Alto.

See also

 Bertram Wolfe

References

External links 

 Letters between Ella Wolfe and Frida Kahlo at the National Museum of Women in the Arts

1896 births
2000 deaths
Emigrants from the Russian Empire to the United States
American communists
Columbia University alumni
Hunter College faculty
People from Williamsburg, Brooklyn